Wixhausen is northernmost borough of the City of Darmstadt in southern Hesse, Germany. Covering an area of 23.247 km2, in 2006 it had 5,772 inhabitants and 1,310 houses. Its main claim to fame is the GSI heavy-ion research laboratory located there.

The district of Darmstadt-Arheilgen is just South of Wixhausen. The city of Erzhausen is just to the North of Wixhausen.

History 
Wixhausen was already inhabited in the Bronze Age. The first signs of settlement in the Wixhausen district can be found around 1400 BC. 750/780 Wixhausen was then incorporated into the Frankish Empire. Wixhausen was first mentioned by name in 1172 as "Wickenhusen", which means something like "settlement by the pond", since in the Middle Ages the area was traversed by several spring streams with small ponds. The baroque evangelical church built between 1774 and 1776 is worth seeing. It has a daily manually wound chime from 1517 in the Romanesque tower from 1150 (the oldest surviving structure in Darmstadt) and special windows (“Physikfenster” by Thomas Duttenhoefer, 1997).

As part of the local government reform in Hesse, the municipality of Wixhausen was incorporated into Darmstadt in 1977.

Coat of arms 
In gold a growing red, blue-tongued lion, with his right paw clasping the blue shaft of a flag squared with silver and red. Registered in the Hessian State Archives in 1962.

Boroughs of Darmstadt 
Darmstadt has 9 official 'Stadtteile' (boroughs). These are, alphabetically:

Darmstadt-Arheilgen
Darmstadt-Bessungen
Darmstadt-Eberstadt
Darmstadt-Kranichstein
Darmstadt-Mitte ('Central')
Darmstadt-Nord ('North')
Darmstadt-Ost ('East')
Darmstadt-West ('West')
Darmstadt-Wixhausen

Transport 

Wixhausen has a small rail station on the Main-Neckar Railway, from which an S3 S-Bahn line, S-Bahn train has connections to the Darmstadt Station on regional services trains stops. Wixhausen and Arheilgen are both on the S3 line. The Darmstadt Station (Hauptbahnhof) has connections to Trams in Darmstadt. Buses: Bus WX and 662 also serve Wixhausen. The main road through the town is the B3. The Bundesautobahn 5 freeway is to the West of town.

Gallery

References

External links

wixhausen.de, Wixhausen web site

Darmstadt